The 2019 World trials season consisted of eight trials events with four main classes: Trial GP, Trial 2, Women's and Women's 2. It began on 26 May, with round one in Pietramurata, Italy and ended with round 8 in La Nucia, Spain on 22 September.

Season summary
Toni Bou would claim his thirteenth outdoor World trials championship in 2019.

Gabriel Marcelli would claim his first World outdoor title, winning the Trial 2 championship in 2019.

Emma Bristow would claim her sixth outdoor World trials championship in 2019.

2019 World trials season calendar

Scoring system
Points were awarded to the top fifteen finishers in each class. All ten rounds counted for the World GP and Trial 2 classes, all five rounds in Women's and all three in Women's 2 classes were counted.

Trial GP final standings

{|
|

Trial 2 final standings

{|
|

Women's final standings

{|
|

Women's 2 final standings

{|
|

References

2019
2019 in motorcycle sport